The Rufus Estabrook House is a historic house at 33 Woodland Road in Newton, Massachusetts.

Description and history 
It is a -story wood-frame structure, two bays in width, with a front-facing gable roof and a porch extending across the front supported by Ionic columns. The entrance is flanked by sidelight windows and wide pilasters. The house was built c. 1848, and is one of the earliest houses built when Auburndale was subdivided for development. It is a well preserved Greek Revival side-hall plan house.

The house was listed on the National Register of Historic Places on September 4, 1986.

See also
 National Register of Historic Places listings in Newton, Massachusetts

References

Houses on the National Register of Historic Places in Newton, Massachusetts
Houses completed in 1848
Greek Revival architecture in Massachusetts